Warren and Wetmore was an architecture firm in New York City which was a partnership between Whitney Warren (1864–1943) and Charles Delevan Wetmore (June 10, 1866  – May 8, 1941), that had one of the most extensive practices of its time and was known for the designing of large hotels.

Partners

Whitney Warren was a cousin of New York's Vanderbilt family, and spent ten years at the École des Beaux Arts. There he met fellow architecture student Emmanuel Louis Masqueray, who would, in 1897 join the Warren and Wetmore firm.  He began practice in New York City in 1887.

Warren's partner, Charles Delevan Wetmore (usually referred to as Charles D. Wetmore), was a lawyer by training.  Their society connections led to commissions for clubs, private estates, hotels and terminal buildings, including the New York Central office building, the Chelsea docks, the Ritz-Carlton, Biltmore, Commodore, and Ambassador Hotels.  They were the preferred architects for Vanderbilt's New York Central Railroad.

Whitney Warren retired in 1931 but occasionally served as consultant. Warren took particular pride in his design of the new library building of the Catholic University of Leuven, finished in 1928, which he wanted to carry the inscription Furore Teutonico Diruta: Dono Americano Restituta ("Destroyed by German fury, restored by American generosity") on the facade. This post-war propaganda was never added to the building. The library was severely damaged by British and German forces during World War II, but was completely restored after the war.

The architectural records of the firm are held by the Dept. of Drawings & Archives at the Avery Architectural and Fine Arts Library, Columbia University.

Commissions

The firm's most important work by far is the construction of Grand Central Terminal in New York City, completed in 1913 in association with Reed and Stem.  Warren and Wetmore were involved in a number of related hotels in the surrounding "Terminal City".

Among the firm's other commissions were:

 the Racquet House at the Tuxedo Club, Tuxedo Park, New York, 1890-1900
 Newport Country Club, Newport, RI, 1895
 Westmorly Court, part of Adams House at Harvard University 1898-1902
 New York Yacht Club Building, 1899–1901
 High Tide, William S. Miller residence, Newport, RI 1900
 10 West 56th Street, the Edey Mansion, 1901
 Kirby Hill Estate (Eric Kuvykin Mansion), Long Island, New York, 1902
 the Marshall Orme Wilson House, 1903
 the Brooklyn Department of Street Cleaning's Stable and Chateau, Brooklyn, New York, 1904
 49 East 52nd Street, Vanderbilt guest house, New York City, 1908
 Green-Wood Cemetery Chapel, New York City, 1911
 Union Station, Winnipeg, Manitoba, Canada, 1911
 Union Station, Houston, Texas, 1911 (Now a part of Minute Maid Park)
 Condado Vanderbilt Hotel, San Juan, Puerto Rico, 1911
 Aeolian Hall, New York City, 1912
 Vanderbilt Hotel, New York City, 1912
 Ritz-Carlton, Montreal, Quebec, 1912
 The Pantlind Hotel, now the Amway Grand Plaza Hotel, Grand Rapids, Michigan, 1913
 Grand Central Palace, New York City, 1913 with Reed and Stem, demolished 1964
 The unfinished Michigan Central Station, Detroit, Michigan, 1913, also with Reed and Stem
 Ritz-Carlton, Philadelphia, PA, 1913, with Horace Trumbauer
 Packard Manor, Chautauqua, New York- A summer home for William Doud Packard, 1915
 the Texas Company, Texaco Building, Houston, Texas, 1915
 New York Central Railroad Station, 1 East Hartsdale Avenue, Hartsdale, New York
 927 Fifth Avenue, New York City, a cooperative apartment house, 1917
The Broadmoor Hotel, Colorado Springs, 1918
 The Ambassador Hotel, Atlantic City, 1919
 Warren Public Library, Warren, Pennsylvania, 1916
 Struthers Library Building, Warren, Pennsylvania, renovations, 1919
 The Commodore Hotel, now the Grand Hyatt New York, part of "Terminal City", 1920
 The New York Biltmore Hotel, also part of "Terminal City"
 Crown Building, formerly the Heckscher Building, New York City, 1921
 The Briarcliffe, 57th Street, New York City
 Ritz-Carlton, Atlantic City, NJ, 1921
 Providence Biltmore Hotel, Providence, Rhode Island, 1922
 Mayflower Hotel, Washington, D.C., 1922, with Robert F. Beresford
 Asbury Park Convention Hall, 1923, and the adjoining Paramount Theatre, 1930
 Madison Belmont Building at Madison Avenue and 34th Street, New York City, 1925
 Steinway Hall at 111 West 57th Street, New York City, 1925
 Italian Embassy building, Washington DC, 1925
 200 Madison Avenue, New York City, 1926
 Royal Hawaiian Hotel, Honolulu, Hawaii, 1927
 689 Fifth Avenue, New York City, 1927
 St. James Theatre, New York City, 1927
 Consolidated Edison Building at 4 Irving Place in Manhattan, 1928
 Norwood Gardens terrace homes, 36th St., Astoria, New York, planned development by W&W architect Walter Hopkins, 1928
 The Helmsley Building, originally the New York Central Building, part of the Grand Central Terminal complex, 1929
 Empire Trust Company Building, 580 Fifth Avenue, New York; currently the World Diamond Building as of 2013
 the Chelsea Piers
 903 Park Avenue, a Bing & Bing building.

Gallery

References
Notes

Bibliography
Pennoyer, Peter and Walker, Anne. The Architecture of Warren & Wetmore  New York: W. W. Norton, 2006. .

External links

"Warren and Wetmore" at New York Architecture Images
High-resolution photographs of the interior of the New York Yacht Club
Warren & Wetmore architectural drawings and photographs, 1889-1938Held by the Department of Drawings & Archives, Avery Architectural & Fine Arts Library, Columbia University

Defunct architecture firms based in New York City
American railway architects